Bukpyeong-myeon (북평면) is a township in South Korea. Located in the county of Jeongseon, the venue of Jeongseon Alpine Centre, where the events of alpine skiing (Super-G and downhill) of the 2018 Winter Olympics were held, is located on its territory.

Jeongseon County
Towns and townships in Gangwon Province, South Korea